Lady Constance Harriet Stuart Milnes Gaskell, DCVO DStJ (née Knox; 21 April 1885 – 29 April 1964) was a Woman of the Bedchamber to Queen Mary from 1937 to 1953 and Lady-in-Waiting to Princess Marina, Duchess of Kent from 1953 to 1960. Lady Gaskell was appointed Dame of Justice, Most Venerable Order of the Hospital of St. John of Jerusalem.

Lady Constance was the second daughter of Constance (née Caulfeild) and the 5th Earl of Ranfurly, who was later Governor of New Zealand from 1897 to 1904. On 7 November 1905, she married Maj. Evelyn Milnes Gaskell, a son of Rt. Hon. Charles Milnes Gaskell.

Two portraits of Lady Constance are part of the collection of the National Portrait Gallery.

Lady Constance Milnes Gaskell died in 1964, eight days after her 79th birthday.

References 

1885 births
1964 deaths
Dames Commander of the Royal Victorian Order
Dames of Justice of the Order of St John
Daughters of Irish earls
Place of birth missing
Place of death missing